William Strong, (13 February 1756 Peterborough  - 8 September 1842 Stanground) was Archdeacon of Northampton from 1797 until his death.

Strong was educated at Charterhouse and  Queens' College, Cambridge; and ordained in 1781. He held incumbencies at  Bolingbroke with Hareby and Billinghay; and was also an Honorary Chaplain to the King.

Notes

1756 births
People from Peterborough
People educated at Charterhouse School
Alumni of Queens' College, Cambridge
Archdeacons of Northampton
Honorary Chaplains to the King
1842 deaths